Dagmar Oakland (born Edna Martine Dagmar Andersen; August 21, 1897 – October 8, 1989) was an American actress of stage and screen from San Francisco, California. Twice she was a member of the Ziegfeld Follies.

Family
Oakland's parents were Edward Andersen of Fredrikstad, Norway and Anna Marthine Olsen, also of Norway. Her siblings' names were Edward, Herbert (née Hagbart), and Vivien. Her sister performed on Broadway and in motion pictures as Vivian Oakland. After the 1906 San Francisco earthquake, Anna Andersen, a widow since 1898, moved the family to Oakland, California, where the sisters took their stage names.

Stage
Edna and Vivien appeared in vaudeville as the Anker sisters (an old family name). They changed their surname to Oakland in tribute to their hometown. They performed as the Oakland Sisters in the Boston Juveniles, a vaudeville group.

They traveled the west coast as far as Seattle, Washington. The sisters ended up in New York City, appearing with the Ziegfeld Follies and other shows. In 1915, Oakland began a solo stage career. In November 1924, she had an important role in Heidelberg, the musical version of a play made famous by Richard Mansfield.

Film career
Beginning in 1930, Oakland performed in Hollywood motion pictures. Her first feature was The Heart Breaker (1930) directed by Edmund Joseph. She was cast with Joan Blondell, Gloria Shea, and Walter Kinsella. She played a reporter in Wedding Present (1936) and a nurse in Hit Parade of 1937. Oakland's film career lasted into the late 1940s with uncredited roles in  Tonight and Every Night (1945), Thrill of a Romance (1945), and Riverboat Rhythm (1946).

Marriage
In 1919, she married Captain Garnette Rotan, who served with distinction in World War I. Their romance began in 1917 when Oakland was playing in a Broadway theater production. The actress became engaged to English actor Thomas Oliver Neville Clark. Clark was deported from America in June 1935 because he overstayed his visitor's permit.

Vivian met and married actor John Murry. The couple had a daughter named Joan. They continued their careers in movies and relocated to southern California. The Murry's operated a small bookshop on Ventura Boulevard in the 1940s. Dagmar Oakland died in Burbank, California, in 1989.

References

 Davenport Democrat and Leader, "Stage and Screen", April 26, 1925, Page 23.
 Indianapolis Star, "Photo Section", November 11, 1924, Page 71.
 Fresno Bee, "Beautiful Dagmar's 13-Day Nightmare", January 3, 1926, Page 3.
 Oakland Tribune, "Dagmar Oakland Loses English Actor Fiance in Deportation Sweep", June 5, 1935, pg 1

External links

 https://www.ibdb.com/broadway-cast-staff/dagmar-oakland-55011

1897 births
1989 deaths
20th-century American actresses
American stage actresses
Vaudeville performers
American female dancers
Dancers from California
Actresses from San Francisco
American people of Norwegian descent
20th-century American dancers